This article lists all-time leading figures achieved in the NBA All-Star Game in every major statistical category recognized by the league.  This includes statistical records set by individuals in single All-Star games and over the course of their careers.

Individual

MVPs
Most awards
4 by Bob Pettit (1 shared award) (1956, 1958, 1959, 1962)
4 by Kobe Bryant (1 shared award) (2002, 2007, 2009, 2011)

Most consecutive awards 	
2 by Bob Pettit (1 shared award) (1958, 1959)
2 by Russell Westbrook (2015, 2016)

All-Star selections
Most selections
19 by Kareem Abdul-Jabbar
19 by LeBron James

Most consecutive selections
19 by LeBron James

Most games played
19 by LeBron James

Most games started
19 by LeBron James

Scoring
Most points – career
426 by LeBron James

Most points per game – career (3 games min.)
25.14 by Giannis Antetokounmpo

Most points – game
55 by Jayson Tatum (2023)

Most points – half
38 by Jayson Tatum (2023)

Most points – quarter
27 by Jayson Tatum (2023)

Minutes
Most minutes – career
522 by LeBron James

Most minutes – game
42 by Oscar Robertson (1964)
42 by Bill Russell (1964)
42 by Jerry West (1964)
42 by Nate Thurmond (1967)

Most minutes per game
33.3 by George Mikan

Rebounds
Most rebounds – career
197 by Wilt Chamberlain

Most offensive rebounds – career
44 by Moses Malone

Most defensive rebounds – career
98 by Tim Duncan

Most rebounds – game
27 by Bob Pettit (1962)

Most rebounds per game
16.2 by Bob Pettit

Most offensive rebounds – game
10 by Kobe Bryant (2011)

Most offensive rebounds per game
4.3 by Shawn Marion

Most defensive rebounds – game
19 by Dikembe Mutombo (2001)

Most defensive rebounds per game
6.5 by Tim Duncan

Most rebounds – half
16 by Bob Pettit (1962)
16 by Wilt Chamberlain (1960)

Most rebounds – quarter
10 by Bob Pettit (1962)

Assists
Most assists – career
128 by Chris Paul

Most assists – game
22 by Magic Johnson (1984)

Most assists per game
11.6 by Chris Paul

Most assists – half
13 by Magic Johnson (1984)

Most assists – quarter
9 by John Stockton (1989)

Field goals
Highest field goal percentage – career
.900 by Rudy Gobert

Most field goals made – career
172 by LeBron James

Most field goals made – game
26 by Anthony Davis (2017)

Most field goals made – half
15 by Anthony Davis (2017)

Most field goals made – quarter
10 by Anthony Davis (2017)

Most field goals attempted – career
334 by LeBron James

Most field goals attempted – game
39 by Anthony Davis (2017)

Most field goals attempted – half
22 by Anthony Davis (2017)

Most field goals attempted – quarter
15 by Anthony Davis (2017)

Free throws
Highest free throw percentage – career
1.000 by Archie Clark
1.000 by Gary Payton
1.000 by Clyde Drexler

Most free throws made – career
78 by Elgin Baylor

Most free throws made – game
12 by Elgin Baylor (1962)
12 by Oscar Robertson (1965)

Most free throws made – half
10 by Zelmo Beaty (1966)

Most free throws made – quarter
9 by Zelmo Beaty (1966)
9 by Julius Erving (1978)

Most free throws attempted – career
98 by Elgin Baylor
98 by Oscar Robertson

Most free throws attempted – game
16 by Wilt Chamberlain (1962)

Most free throws attempted – half
12 by Zelmo Beaty (1966)

Most free throws attempted – quarter
11 by Julius Erving (1978)

Three-point shooting
Highest three-point percentage – career
.714 by Jaylen Brown

Most three-point field goals made – career
47 by Stephen Curry

Most three-point field goals made – game
16 by Stephen Curry (2022)

Most three-point field goals made – half
9 by Jayson Tatum (2023)

Most three-point field goals attempted – career
130 by LeBron James

Most three-point field goals attempted – game
27 by Stephen Curry (2022)

Most three-point field goals attempted – half
15 by Stephen Curry (2022)

Steals
Most steals – career
38 by Kobe Bryant

Most steals per game
3.2 by Rick Barry

Most steals – game
8 by Rick Barry (1975)

Most steals – half
5 by Larry Bird (1986)

Most steals – quarter
4 by Fred Brown (1976)
4 by Larry Bird (1986)
4 by Isiah Thomas (1989)

Blocks
Most blocks – career
31 by Kareem Abdul-Jabbar

Most blocks per game
2.07 by Kareem Abdul-Jabbar

Most blocks – game
6 by Kareem Abdul-Jabbar (1980)Most blocks – half
4 by Kareem Abdul-Jabbar (1980)
4 by Michael Jordan (1988)
4 by Hakeem Olajuwon (1994)

Most blocks – quarter
4 by Kareem Abdul-Jabbar (1980)

Triple doubles
Michael Jordan – 14 points, 11 rebounds, 11 assists in 26 minutes (1997)
LeBron James – 29 points, 12 rebounds, 10 assists in 32 minutes (2011)
Dwyane Wade – 24 points, 10 rebounds, 10 assists in 33 minutes (2012)
Kevin Durant – 21 points, 10 rebounds, 10 assists in 27 minutes (2017)

Team

Scoring
Most points – team
196 by West All-Stars (2016)
Most points – both teams
374 (2017)
Most points in a half – team
104 by West All-Stars (2016)
Most points in a half – both teams
191 (2023)
Most points in a quarter – team
60 by Team LeBron (2021)
Most points in a quarter – both teams
101 (2017)
101 (2021)
Fewest points – team
75 by East All-Stars (1953)
Fewest points – both teams
154 (1953)
Largest margin of victory
40 (153–113) by West All-Stars (1992)
Smallest margin of victory
1 (124–123) by East All-Stars (1965)
1 (108–107) by West All-Stars (1971)
1 (125–124) by West All-Stars (1977)
1 (111–110) by East All-Stars (2001)

Field goals
Highest field goal percentage – team
0.653 (64/98) by West All-Stars (1992)
Highest field goal percentage – both teams
0.608 (155/255) (2023)
Lowest field goal percentage – team
0.292 (35/120) by West All-Stars (1966)
Lowest field goal percentage – both teams
0.362 (59/163) (1953)
Most field goals made – team
84 by West All-Stars (2017)
Most field goals made – both teams
162 (2017)
Most field goals made in a half – team
44 by Team Giannis (2023)
Most field goals made in a half – both teams
83 (2017)
Most field goals made in a quarter – team
22 by West All-Stars (2017)
Most field goals made in a quarter – both teams
42 (2017)
Fewest field goals made – team
25 by East All-Stars (1953)
Fewest field goals made – both teams
59 (1953)
Most field goals attempted – team
149 by West All-Stars (2016)
Most field goals attempted – both teams
286 (2016)
Most field goals attempted in a half – team
79 by West All-Stars (2016)
Most field goals attempted in a half – both teams
148 (2016)
Most field goals attempted in a quarter – team
41 by West All-Stars (2016)
Most field goals attempted in a quarter – both teams
77 (2016)
Fewest field goals attempted – team
66 by East All-Stars (1953)
Fewest field goals attempted – both teams
162 (1953)

Three-point field goals
Most three-point field goals made – team
35 by Team LeBron (2019)
Most three-point field goals made – both teams
62 (2019)
Most three-point field goals attempted – team
90 by Team LeBron (2019)
Most three-point field goals attempted – both teams
167 (2019)

Free throws
Highest free throw percentage –  team
1.000 (18/18) by West All-Stars (1973)
1.000 (9/9) by East All-Stars (2014)
1.000 (4/4) by East All-Stars (2017)
Highest free throw percentage – both teams
0.875 (7/8) (2017)
Lowest free throw percentage – team
0.364 (4/11) by West All-Stars (2004)
Lowest free throw percentage – both teams
0.500 (16/32) (2004)
0.500 (11/22) (2007)
0.500 (14/28) (2008)
Most free throws made – team
40 by East All-Stars (1959)
Most free throws made – both teams
71 (OT) (1987)
70 (1961)
Most free throws made in a half – team
26 by East All-Stars (1959)
Most free throws made in a half – both teams
36 (1961)
Most free throws made in a quarter – team
19 by East All-Stars (1986)
Most free throws made in a quarter – both teams
27 (1986) 
Fewest free throws made – team
0 by Team LeBron (2023)
Fewest free throws made – both teams
3 (2023)
Most free throws attempted – team
57 by West All-Stars (1970)
Most free throws attempted – both teams
95 (1956)
Most free throws attempted in a half – team
31 by East All-Stars (1959)
Most free throws attempted in a half – both teams
57 (1962)
Most free throws attempted in a quarter – team
25 by West All-Stars (1970)
Most free throws attempted in a quarter – both teams
33 (1962)
33 (OT) (1993)
Fewest free throws attempted – team
0 by Team LeBron (2023)
Fewest free throws attempted – both teams
4 (2023)

Rebounds
Most rebounds recorded – team
83 by East All-Stars (1966)
Most rebounds recorded – both teams
151 (1960)
Most rebounds recorded in a half – team
51 by East All-Stars (1966)
Most rebounds recorded in a half – both teams
98 (1962)
98 (1966)
Most rebounds recorded in a quarter – team
30 by West All-Stars (1966)
Most rebounds recorded in a quarter – both teams
58 (1966)
Fewest rebounds recorded – team
37 by West All-Stars (1983)
Fewest rebounds recorded – both teams
89 (1983)

Assists
Most assists – team
60 by West All-Stars (2017)
Most assists – both teams
103 (2017)
Most assists in a half – team
34 by West All-Stars (2017)
Most assists in a half – both teams
57 (2017)
Most assists in a quarter – team
20 by Team Giannis (2019)
Most assists in a quarter – both teams
30 (2019)
Fewest assists – team
15 by West All-Stars (1965)
Fewest assists – both teams
37 (1964)

Steals
Most steals – team
24 by East All-Stars (1989)
Most steals – both teams
40 (1989)

Blocks
Most blocks – team
16 (OT) by West All-Stars (1980)
12 by West All-Stars (1994)
Most blocks – both teams
25 (OT) (1980)
21 (1994)

All-Star Weekend records
Most Skills Challenge Contests won
2 by Dwyane Wade (2006, 2007)
2 by Steve Nash (2005, 2010)
2 by Damian Lillard (2013, 2014)

Most consecutive Skills Challenge Contests won
2 by Dwyane Wade (2006, 2007)
2 by Damian Lillard (2013, 2014)

Most Slam Dunk Contests won
3 by Nate Robinson (2006, 2009, 2010)

Most consecutive Slam Dunk Contests won
2 by Michael Jordan (1987, 1988)
2 by Jason Richardson (2002, 2003)
2 by Nate Robinson (2009, 2010)
2 by Zach LaVine (2015, 2016)

Most Three-Point Shootout Contests won
3 by Larry Bird (1986, 1987, 1988)
3 by Craig Hodges (1990, 1991, 1992)

Most consecutive Three-Point Shootout Contests won
3 by Larry Bird (1986, 1987, 1988)
3 by Craig Hodges (1990, 1991, 1992)

 Youngest Slam Dunk Contest Champion
Kobe Bryant

 Youngest Three-Point Shootout Contest Champion
Kyrie Irving

 Youngest Skills Challenge Contest Champion
Karl-Anthony Towns
 Oldest Slam Dunk Contest Champion
Dominique Wilkins
 Oldest Three-Point Shootout Contest Champion
Jeff Hornacek
 Oldest Skills Challenge Contest Champion
Steve Nash

Other records
Attendance
 108,713 for the 2010 NBA All-Star Game which was held in Cowboys Stadium at Arlington, Texas — the largest attendance in history for any basketball game.
 Youngest All-Star Game MVP
LeBron James
 Oldest All-Star Game MVP
Shaquille O'Neal
 Youngest Rising Stars Challenge MVP
Kyrie Irving
 Oldest Rising Stars Challenge MVP
Bogdan Bogdanović
 Youngest/Oldest player to start in an All-Star game
 Oldest: Michael Jordan of the Washington Wizards became the oldest player to start in an NBA All-Star Game at the age of 39 years, 357 days after Vince Carter gave away his starting spot in favor of Jordan's final NBA All-star game appearance during the 2003 NBA All-Star Game.
 Youngest: Kobe Bryant of the Los Angeles Lakers became the youngest player to start in an NBA All-Star game at the age of 19 years, 170 days during the 1998 NBA All-Star Game.

See also
List of NBA regular season records 
List of NBA post-season records

References

External links
http://NBA.com/history
http://www.nbahoopsonline.com

All Star Game Records